The NCAA Division I Women's Soccer Championship, sometimes known as the Women's College Cup, is an American college soccer tournament conducted by the National Collegiate Athletic Association (NCAA), and determines the Division I women's national champion.

History
The NCAA began conducting a single division Women's Soccer Championship tournament in 1982 with a 12-team tournament. The tournament became the Division I Championship in 1986, when Division III was created for non-scholarship programs.  Currently, the tournament field consists of 64 teams.  The semifinals and final of the tournament, held at a single site every year, are collectively known as the Women's College Cup (analogous to the College Cup in men's soccer).

Historically, North Carolina has been the dominant school in Division I women's soccer.  Known widely as one of the most successful collegiate programs in any NCAA sport, the Tar Heels have won 22 national championships of the 31 NCAA tournaments contested.  They also won the only AIAW national championship in soccer in 1981. The Tar Heels have reached the College Cup 30 times.  Head coach Anson Dorrance is considered one of the greatest women's soccer coaches in NCAA history, leading the Tar Heels since the inception of the program in 1979.

Only six other schools have multiple titles, Notre Dame (3 titles, 5-times runner-up and 12 College Cup appearances), Florida State (3 titles, 3-time runner-up and 12 college cup appearances), Stanford (3 titles, 2-times runner-up and 10 College Cup appearances), Santa Clara (2 titles, 1-time runner up and 11 College Cup appearances), Portland (2 titles, 1-time runner-up and 8 College Cup appearances), and USC (2 titles, 2 College Cup appearances).

Champions 

Notes

Team titles

Performance by team
  First round
   Round of 24 (1993 - 1994); Round of 32 (1995 - present)
   Round of 12 (1982 - 1992); Round of 16 (1993 - present)
  Quarterfinals
  Semifinals
  National Runner-up
  National Champion

In 2001 and 2002, the top 8 teams were seeded 1 through 8.

See also

AIAW Intercollegiate Women's Soccer Champions
 NCAA Women's Soccer Championships (Division II, Division III)
 NCAA Men's Soccer Championships (Division I, Division II, Division III)
 NAIA Women's Soccer Championship
 Intercollegiate Soccer Football Association
 NCAA Division I Women's Soccer Championship bids by school

References

External links
 

 
NCAA Division I women's soccer conference tournaments
1982 establishments in the United States
Recurring sporting events established in 1982